The 1992–93 FIBA European League, also shortened to 1992–93 FIBA EuroLeague, was the 36th season of the European top-tier level professional club competition for basketball clubs (now called EuroLeague). It featured 42 competing teams from 33 countries. The final of the competition was held on April 15, 1993, at the Peace and Friendship Stadium in Piraeus, Greece, with Limoges CSP defeating Benetton Treviso, by a score of 59–55. The defending title holder, Partizan, was not allowed in the competition because of United Nations Security Council Resolution 757, which imposed sanctions against Yugoslavia.

Competition system
42 teams (the cup title holder, national domestic league champions, and a variable number of other clubs from the most important national domestic leagues) played knock-out rounds on a home and away basis. The aggregate score of both games decided the winner. 
The sixteen remaining teams after the knock-out rounds entered the Regular Season Group Stage, divided into two groups of eight teams, playing a round-robin. The final standing was based on individual wins and defeats. In the case of a tie between two or more teams after the group stage, the following criteria were used to decide the final classification: 1) number of wins in one-to-one games between the teams; 2) basket average between the teams; 3) general basket average within the group.
The top four teams from each group after the Regular Season Group Stage qualified for a Quarterfinal Playoff (X-pairings, best of 3 games).
The four winners of the Quarterfinal Playoff qualified for the Final Stage (Final Four), which was played at a predetermined venue.

First round

|}

Second round

|}

Automatically qualified to the group stage
 Partizan (title holder)**
 Marbella Joventut
 Benetton Treviso

*Crvena zvezda was drawn for the competition but was not allowed to compete due to UN embargo on FR Yugoslavia. PAOK went through with a walkover.

**Partizan was drawn for the competition but was not allowed to compete due to UN embargo on FR Yugoslavia. FIBA decided not to replace Partizan with another team for the Regular Season Group Stage, so the 15 qualified clubs had to be unevenly distributed in this round (a group of 8 teams and another of only 7).

Regular season
If one or more clubs are level on won-lost record, tiebreakers are applied in the following order:
Head-to-head record in matches between the tied clubs
Overall point difference in games between the tied clubs
Overall point difference in all group matches (first tiebreaker if tied clubs are not in the same group)
Points scored in all group matches
Sum of quotients of points scored and points allowed in each group match

Quarterfinals

Seeded teams played games 2 and 3 at home.

|}

Final four

Semifinals
April 13, Peace and Friendship Stadium, Piraeus

|}

3rd place game
April 15, Peace and Friendship Stadium, Piraeus

|}

Final
April 15, Peace and Friendship Stadium, Piraeus

|}

Final standings

Awards

1993 FIBA European League All-Final Four Team

References

External links
1992–93 FIBA European League
1992–93 FIBA European League

 
 
EuroLeague seasons